Harkaway may refer to:

Harkaway, Victoria, a suburb of Melbourne, Australia
Harkaway, Ontario, in Canada

People with the surname
Nick Harkaway (born 1972), English novelist